Avajan is a commune in the Louron Valley in the Hautes-Pyrénées department in southwestern France.

The center of the commune is the old village, centered on the church and town hall. Many developments have grown up on the outskirts of the old village since the 1970s, including a man-made lake and camping area.

Population

See also
Communes of the Hautes-Pyrénées department

References

Communes of Hautes-Pyrénées